Franco Diogene (20 October 1947 –  27 May 2005) was an Italian actor and comedian.

Life and career 
Born Concetto Francesco Diogene in Catania, he was the son of a Sicilian father and a Ligurian mother. At 5 years old, Diogene moved to Genoa with his family. In Genoa he completed his studies, and also started acting in a little theater of a parish. Since the early 1970s, he was one of the most active character actors in Italian cinema, often cast in humorous roles. He was also cast in several international productions, such as Midnight Express, in a role of Turkish lawyer  and The Name of the Rose, mainly thanks to his foreign language skills. Diogene was also active as a stand-up comedian, and he was the organizer of the beauty contest "Miss Top Model Universe".

Diogene died of a heart attack, aged 57 years old.

Selected filmography

 Due mafiosi contro Al Capone (1966) - Night club Announcer
 Maria Rosa la guardona (1973)
 Teresa the Thief (1973)
 Il colonnello Buttiglione diventa generale (1974)
 Kidnap (1974) - Nino
 Ante Up (1974) - Peppino il Barbiere
 Buttiglione diventa capo del servizio segreto (1975) - Tenente Parisi
 The Suspicious Death of a Minor (1975) - Pesce's Lawyer (uncredited)
 Nude per l'assassino (1975) - Maurizio
 Teasers (1975) - Monica's Lover
 La collegiale (1975) - Carlo De Marchi
 Il giustiziere di mezzogiorno (1975) - Vigile Corrotto
 Sex with a Smile (1976) - Ignazio, her husband (segment "I soldi in banca")
 La madama (1976) - Fruttivendolo
  (1976) - Garage Owner (uncredited)
 Roma, l'altra faccia della violenza (1976) - Lawyer
 Goodnight, Ladies and Gentlemen (1976) - Grocer (uncredited)
 Cuginetta, amore mio! (1976) - Sciaccaluga
 Tentacles (1977) - Chuck
 Taxi Girl (1977) - Sheik Abdul Lala
 Midnight Express (1978) - Yesil
 Gardenia (1979) - Friend of Gardenia
 A Policewoman on the Porno Squad (1979) - Joe Maccarone
 I contrabbandieri di Santa Lucia (1979) - Achmet
 Supersexymarket (1979)
 Saturday, Sunday and Friday (1979) - The lawyer (segment "Venerdì")
 Il viziaccio (1980)
 City of Women (1980) - Party Guest (uncredited)
 L'insegnante al mare con tutta la classe (1980) - Headmaster
 Delitto a Porta Romana (1980) - Busoni - the usurer
 Trhauma (1980) - Bitto
 Il terno a letto (1980)
 Madly in Love (1981) - Capo cameriere
 Il paramedico (1982) - 'Palletta'-The Car Wrecker
 La casa stregata (1982)
 Attenti a quei P2 (1982) - Emiro Kashieri
 Giovani, belle... probabilmente ricche (1982) - L'avvocato
 Grand Hotel Excelsior (1980) - Ing. Binotti
 Attila flagello di Dio (1982) - Mercante genovese
 Heads I Win, Tails You Lose (1982) - The soccer team's owner
 Stesso mare stessa spiaggia (1983) - Piero
 The World of Don Camillo (1984) - Binella
 Il ragazzo di campagna (1984) - 1st Recruitment Manager
 Madman at War (1985) - Nitti
 Killer contro killers (1985) - Hagen
 Le miniere del Kilimangiaro (1986) - Tai-Ling
 The Name of the Rose (1986) - Päpstliche Gesandte #1
 7 chili in 7 giorni (1986) - Assessore Turri
 Il burbero (1986) - Controllore vagoni letto
 Il lupo di mare (1987)
 Russicum - I giorni del diavolo (1988)
 The Big Blue (1988) - Receptionist
 Interzone (1989) - Rat
 There Was a Castle with Forty Dogs (1990) - Padre di Violetta
 The Bachelor (1990)
 Occhio alla perestrojka (1990) - Racist Receptionist
 Fuga da Kayenta (1991) - Sheriff Baker
 Acquitted for Having Committed the Deed (1992)
 Ci hai rotto papà (1993) - Colonnello Nardini
 Piccolo grande amore (1993)
 Caino e Caino (1993) - Direttore della Casa di Riposo
 The House of the Spirits (1993) - Man at the Party
 18000 giorni fa (1993) - Dottor Bianchi
 Policemen (1995) - Bunny
 The Stendhal Syndrome (1996) - Victim's husband
 Esercizi di stile (1996)
 Con rabbia e con amore (1997) - Man with white Mercedes near the beach
 Il tocco - La sfida (1997) - Omaccio
 Figurine (1997) - Mister Atlas
 La classe non è acqua (1997) - Professore siciliano
 Boom (1999) - Coluso (Segment: Il figlio di Claudio Villa)
 Voci (2000) - Libraio
 Proibito baciare (2000)
 The Bankers of God: The Calvi Affair (2002) - Luigi Mennini
 Il compagno americano (2003) - Carboni

References

External links 

1947 births
2005 deaths 
Italian male stage actors
Italian male film actors
Italian male television actors 
Actors from Catania
20th-century Italian male actors
People of Ligurian descent